The following is a list of Nike missile sites operated by the United States Army. This article lists sites in the United States, most responsible to Army Air Defense Command; however, the Army also deployed Nike missiles to Europe as part of the NATO alliance, with sites being operated by both American and European military forces. U.S. Army Nike sites were also operational in South Korea, Japan and were sold to Taiwan.

Leftover traces of the approximately 265 Nike missile bases can still be seen around cities across the United States. As the sites were decommissioned, they were first offered to federal agencies. Many were already on Army National Guard bases who continued to use the property. Others were offered to state and local governments, while others were sold to school districts. The leftovers were offered to private individuals. Many Nike sites are now municipal yards, communications, and FAA facilities, probation camps, and even renovated for use as airsoft gaming and military simulation training complexes. Several were obliterated and turned into parks. Some are now private residences. Only a few are intact and preserve the history of the Nike project.

Belgium
General Belgian Nike info: The Nike missile system was operational in the Belgian airforce from 1959 until 1990. It was organized into a Missile Group (the overall staffing); a Support Wing (tech and log support), and 2 (9th and 13th) Missile Wings, each with 4 subordinate units. All Belgian Nike sites were in the 2 ATAF part of then West-Germany. Their defending area was the industrial Ruhr area.

 Blankenheim in the federal state of Nordrhein Westfalen (NRW). Unit: 13th Missile Wing, 51st (B) Squadron 1961–1989. Operating 36x Nike Herc. (10x Nuclear armed) US custodians: 43rd (B) USAAD. Former IFC at 50°26'45"N 06°40'27"E. Former LA at 50°26'29"N 6°41'52"E. Unit disbanded and site closed.
Düren in NRW. Units: Hq 13th Missile Wing; Missile Support Wing; Group Operations Center and 50th (A) Squadron 1959–1990. Former combined IFC/LA location at 50°41'20"N 06°30'13" E when operating 12 x Nike Ajax missiles. This became the IFC when 50th Sq started Nike Herc ops. 36x Nike Herc. (10x Nuclear-armed) US Custodians: 43rd (C) USAAD. LA then moved to 50°42'44" N 6°32'3"E. Unit disbanded, and the site closed.
 in NRW. Unit: 13th Missile Wing, 57th (D) Squadron 1974–1984. Note: The site was taken over from the Netherlands air force in 1974, becoming ops in 1975 as 13th Missile Wing/57 Sq operating 36x Nike Herc conventional role. The unit was later reassigned to the 9th Missile Wing/57th Sq as it was the most Northern Belgian site. Former IFC demolished. Former LA at 51°44'21"N 6°53'53"E. Unit disbanded, closing the site.
Euskirchen in NRW. Unit: 13th Missile Wing, 52nd (C) Squadron 1959–1986. Operating 36 x Nike Herc (10x nuclear-armed) US custodians: 43rd (A) USAAD. Former IFC at 50°37'20"N 06°44'37"E. Former LA at 50°37'36" N 6°45'38" E. Unit disbanded, and the site closed.
Grefrath in NRW. Units: Belgian Group Missiles 1959–1990; staffing and liaison element between the Nike Wings and the Belgian air force staff. Family lodging was at nearby Kempen; Hq 9th Missile Wing; Group Operations Center; 56th Squadron 51°2'2"N  6°20'2" E.
Hinsbeck in NRW. 9th Missile Wing, 56th (C) Squadron 1962–1989. Operating 36x Nike Herc (10x Nuclear-armed) US custodians: B team 507th USAAD. Former IFC demolished. Former LA at 51°21'56"N 6°17'25" E. Unit disbanded, closing the site.
Hombroich in NRW. 9th Missile Wing, 55th (B) Squadron 1962–1985. Operating 36x Nike Herc (10x Nuclear-armed) US custodians: C team 507th USAAD. Former IFC at 51°8'27.30"N 6°37'26.49"E. Former LA at 51°9'6"N 6°38'35"E is now a modern art museum.  Military family housing 53rd and 55th Squadrons were nearby Grevenbroich. The unit disbanded, and the site closed.
Kaster in NRW. 9th Missile Wing, 53rd (D) Squadron 1959–1978. Reassigned 13th Missile Wing / 56th Sq 1979–1985. Operating 36x Nike Herc missiles (10x Nuclear-armed) US custodians: 43rd (A) USAAD. Former IFC at 51°01'25"N 06°58'36" E. Former LA at 51°1'24"N 6°29'49"E. Unit disbanded, and the site closed.
Xanten in NRW. 9th Missile Wing, 54th (A) Squadron 1971–1989. Operating 36x Nike Herc (10x Nuclear-armed) US custodians: A team 507th USAAD. The former basecamp at 51°38'50"N 06°26'31" E was rebuilt into an automotive area. Former IFC at 51°38'30"N 06°22'34" E. Former LA at 51°38'48"N 6°24'33"E. Unit disbanded, and the site closed.

Denmark

Germany

94th ADA Group, headquartered in Kaiserslautern for most of the Nike-Hercules period had four battalions as follows, with locations:

2/1 ADA headquartered in Wackernheim

- A Battery: Wackernheim

- B Battery: Dexheim

- C Battery: Quirnheim

- D Battery: Dichtelbach

5/6 ADA headquartered in Neubruecke 

- A Battery: Schoenborn

- B Battery: Wueschheim

- C Battery: Baumholder

- D Battery: Hontheim

2/56 ADA headquartered in Pirmasens

- A Battery: Geinsheim

- B Battery: Landau

- C Battery: Salzwoog

- D Battery: Oberauerbach

3/71 ADA headquartered in Ludwigsburg

- A Battery: Dallau

- B Battery: Grosssachsenheim

- C Battery: Hardheim

- D Battery: Pforzheim

- In Pforzheim (Hagenschieß/Wurmberg), in Baden-Württemberg there is a missile launch site operated by the US-Army until April 1985.

It was part of the Nike-Belt, a defense system which was created to defend Europe against the then newly invented jets. The site fired Nike missiles at potentially incoming jets as part of the  Project Nike.

Greece

Italy

Japan

On Okinawa, the 30th ADA Brigade was on Okinawa. On Reversion Day, May 15, 1972, all Nike Hercules missile sites were handed over to the JASDF. Battery 8,8th Battalion,3rd Air Defense Brigade was located on the Chinen peninsula in southern part of the island. The U.S. reverted the islands to Japan on May 15, 1972, setting back a Ryūkyū independence movement that had emerged.

Netherlands

Norway

Spain

Turkey

Taiwan

United States
This list is sorted by state. The "Missile type" code indicates the numbers and types of missiles and other installation details. For example, "2AK/18L-H" means the site contained two Nike Ajax magazines (A), located above ground (K), with eight launchers (8L) being converted to Nike Hercules (H). Many listings will have "FDS" following either the control site or launch site heading, which means that the site has gone through the "Formerly-Used Defense Site" program and has been transferred from DoD control to another party. With the exception of Alaska, in which sites were given a specific name, Nike missile sites were designated by a coding system of the Defense Area Name abbreviation; a two-digit number representing the degree from north converted to a number between 01 and 99 (North being 01; East being 25; South being 50; West being 75), and a letter, L = launch site, C = IFC (Integrated Fire Control) site. The Formerly Used Defense Sites (FDS) program processed many former sites and then transferred them out of Defense Department control.

Alaska
The Alaska Nike sites were under the control of United States Army Alaska (USARAK), rather than Army Air Defense Command.

California

Connecticut

Florida

Georgia

Hawaii

Illinois and Northwest Indiana

Kansas

Louisiana

Maine

Maryland/District of Columbia/Northern Virginia

Massachusetts

Michigan

Minnesota

Missouri

Nebraska

New Jersey

Links: Sandy Hook Tours :: Site NY-56 :: Gateway National Park :: NJ 14 Missile Bases :: NY-56 History :: Trip Advisor :: Highlands Air Force Station

New Mexico

New York

Ohio

Pennsylvania

Rhode Island

South Dakota

Texas

Virginia
{| class="wikitable borderless"
|- valign="top"
| Norfolk Defense Area (N): Headquarters facilities were located at Fort Monroe, Ballantine School in Norfolk, Reedsville/South Norfolk, Craddock Branch/Portsmouth, and Newport News. The world's largest naval complex received an extensive air defense network. Sites N-25, N-52, and N-85 were modernized to fire the Nike Hercules missile. Site N-63 was the last to operate Nike Ajax, being deactivated in November 1964. Both Regular Army and Virginia Army National Guard units contributed to the manning of the sites. Sites at (N-52) Deep Creek/Portsmouth and (N-85) Denbigh/Patrick Henry remained active until April 1974.

An Army Air-Defense Command Post (AADCP) was established at Cape Charles AFS, VA in 1958 for Nike missile command-and-control functions. The site was equipped with the AN/GSG-5(V) BIRDIE solid-state computer system.

The AADCP was later integrated with the USAF Air Defense Command/NORAD Semi Automatic Ground Environment (SAGE) air defense radar network as Site P-56 / Z-56'''. The AADCP inactivated in June 1974.

| 
|}

Washington

Wisconsin

See also

 

References

Further reading

External links

 Nike Missile System at TheMilitaryStandard
 Nike Missile Site Locations by State at TheMilitaryStandard
 Locations of Former Nike Site Locations & Status (text) at Ed Thelen's Nike Missile Web Site

 Alaska
 History and Pictures of PH-32
 Fairleigh Dickinson University page on PH-32
 
 
 Nike-Hercules ALASKA website
 Nike Missile Site Bay
 Nike Missile Site Summit
 Nike Missile Jig Launch Battery Site

 California
 Nike Missile Site LA-04 Mt Gleason CA
 The Missiles of Los Angeles
 Nike Missile Base SF-91

 Connecticut
 Nike BR-04 Ansonia

 Florida
 
 History of the North Key Largo Missile Site
 HM69 Nike Missile Base

 Hawaii
 
 
 
 
 Nike Missile site coordinates
 Nike Missile OA-32 IFC

 Northwest Indiana and Illinois
 Nike Missile Base C-84. Illinois
 
 
 Nike Missile Site C-03

 Maryland, Northern Virginia, and Washington, D.C.
 Granite Nike Missile Base BA-79
 AA-38: Annapolis-Bay Bridge Nike Missile Site W-26
 Nike Missile Base W-25

 Massachusetts
 Nike Missile Site B-38 Hingham
 Nike Missile Site BO-37
 Nike B-05L Missile Site – Danvers, MA 11/29/05

 Michigan
 Nike Missile Battery D-57/58 Detroit Michigan
 
 
 

 Missouri
 Nike Missile Base SL-40
 

 Minnesota
 Nike Site MS-40
 

 Nebraska
 Lincoln Air Force Base Online Museum

 New Jersey
 Nike Missile Sites in New Jersey

 New Mexico
 Nike Missile WA-10 Launch Battery Site
 Nike Missile WA-50 Launch Battery Site

 Ohio
 Cleveland Area Former Nike Missile Sites
 

 Pennsylvania
 "Shielding Pittsburgh business" at the Pittsburgh Post-Gazette 
 BRISTOL NIKE BASE – PH-15
 NIKE MISSILE BATTERY PH-23/25 
 
 

 Rhode Island
 Nike Missile Battery PR-79 Foster Rhode Island
 
 
 
 Providence Defense Area at the Encyclopedia Astronautica''
 Amateur Radio W2HYN—includes sections devoted to the Bristol, RI, Nike site and to other Cold War Nike, missile and radar installations

 Texas
 Nike Missile BG-40 Launch Battery Site
 Nike Missile BG-80 Launch Battery Site
 Nike Missile BG-40 IFC Site
 Nike Missile DY-50 Launch Battery Site
 Nike Missile DY-50 IFC Site
 Nike Missile DY-10 IFC Site
 Nike Missile DF-01 IFC Site

 Virginia
 1954 Nike-Ajax Missile Site N-75L

 Washington (state)
 Nike Missile F-37 Launch Battery Site
 Nike Missile F-87 IFC Site
 Nike Missile H-12 Launch Battery Site
 Nike Missile H-83 Launch Battery Site
 Nike Missile S-92 Launch Battery Site
 Nike Missile S-81 Launch Battery Site
 Nike Missile S-20 Launch Battery Site

 
Cold War-related lists

United States history-related lists
Evesham Township, New Jersey
Cold War history of the United States
Military history of New Jersey